Pierces Chapel (also Pierce's Chapel) is an unincorporated community in Cherokee County, Texas, United States.

History
Pierces Chapel is on Farm Road 747, 14 miles northwest of Rusk, Texas. The community was named for the Methodist church in the community  which was named for Bishop George Foster Pierce of the Methodist Episcopal Church, who preached there, when he was going to the annual Texas state conference of the Methodist Episcopal Church.

Notes

Unincorporated communities in Cherokee County, Texas
Unincorporated communities in Texas